Girton College Boat Club is the rowing club for members of Girton College, Cambridge.

Girton was originally a college for women only; male undergraduates were first allowed in 1979. The women's 1st VIII quickly rose to take the headship of the Lent Bumps in 1979 and 1981, but since have hovered largely in the bottom half of the 1st division, with a brief period at the top of the second division in the early 2010s. In the May Bumps, Girton's 1st women rose as high as 3rd in 1979 and 1982, but dropped into the 2nd division by 1994, moving back into the 1st division by 2001. With male undergraduates first arriving in Michaelmas term 1979, a men's crew first appeared in 1980 in both the Lent and May Bumps, rising to the 1st division in the Lent Bumps by 1995. Since then, the men's 1st VIII has remained around the bottom of the 1st division or top of the 2nd division, although it currently stands at its highest ever position at 9th (Lent Bumps 2012). In the May Bumps, the 1st men's VIII took until 1991 to get firmly into the 2nd division. In the 2012 May Bumps, Girton moved into the first division for the first time. Girton are yet to take a men's headship. 2014 saw success for the club's women as the first boat returned to the first division of the Lent Bumps and then won blades to move up to 11th in the first division in the Mays. 2014 therefore saw both of Girton's first boats in both Lents and Mays first divisions for the first time.

The Infidel BC
The Infidel Boat Club (TIBC) is Girton's alumni boat club. The Club exists to encourage networking between alumni who used to row; to support Girton College Boat Club; and to promote rowing within the College and beyond. Since its formation in 2001, TIBC has enabled more than 40 Old Girtonians to get out on the water. The Club organises rowing and social events in Cambridge, London and beyond.

References

External links
 Girton College Boat Club

Rowing clubs of the University of Cambridge
Boat
Rowing clubs in Cambridgeshire
Rowing clubs in England
Rowing clubs of the River Cam